In Costa Rica, in recent years, a cédula de identidad, has been a credit card-sized plastic card. On one side, it includes a photo of the person, a personal identification number, and the card's owner personal information (complete name, gender, birth place, birth date, and others), and the user's signature. On the reverse, it may include additional information such as the date when the ID card was granted, expiration date of the ID card, and other such as their fingerprints, and all the owner's information in matrix code. Every Costa Rican citizen must carry an ID card immediately after turning 18.

The cards may include several security measures, including the use of ultraviolet coating.

In the near future in Costa Rica, the cédulas de identidad will also be used in the digital signature process.

As of January 2020, the Costa Rican Tribunal Supremos De Elecciones (TSE) is in the planning and testing stages to move from a physical card to the use of biometrics for purposes of identification, eliminating the current plastic card. A move that would be in line with the country's goal of being carbon neutral.

This law was issued in response to individuals who in a single year requested as many as three or four cédulas, which had a production cost of US$7.29 by 2022. The TSE had documented cases of people who during their adulthood had applied for as many as 150 identity cards.

References

Costa Rica
Government of Costa Rica